QBE Insurance Group Limited is a general insurance and reinsurance company listed on the Australian Securities Exchange and headquartered in Sydney. The company employs more than 11,700 people in over 27 countries. Across its operations, QBE offers commercial, personal and specialty products and risk management products.

History
QBE was founded in 1886 as the North Queensland Insurance Co in Townsville, by two Scottish migrants, James Burns and Robert Philp, founders of shipping company Burns Philp to insure its ships.

QBE was listed on the Australian Securities Exchange in 1973 from the merger of three companies whose names represent the letters of the combined company, Queensland Insurance, Bankers' and Traders' Insurance Company, and Equitable Life and General Insurance Co., and its founding chairman was J. D. O. Burns.

Since then, QBE has continued to acquire many companies. In 1999 it purchased a 50% shareholding in Mercantile Mutual. In 2004 it purchased the other 50% from ING. In February 2007, it acquired Mexican insurer Seguros Cumbre SA de CV, whose net tangible assets were estimated at $26 million, and American insurer General Casualty Insurance. In 2011, QBE purchased Balboa Insurance of California from the Bank of America.

Organisational structure
The organisational structure of QBE Insurance Group is composed of three geographic-based operating divisions, a captive reinsurer (Equator Re) headquartered in Bermuda, an offshore service centre in the Philippines, and various corporate functions located in the group head office in Sydney, Australia.

North America
Headquartered in New York, with offices throughout the United States, North America's insurance portfolio consists of four major divisions:

 Specialty and commercial 
 Alternative markets
 Crop
 Reinsurance

International
Headquartered in London, the International division consists of the organisation's European Operations and Asian Operations (Hong Kong, Singapore, Vietnam, and Malaysia). The international division is a leading commercial property,  specialty, and multi-national insurance provider with global underwriting capabilities and a major presence in the Lloyds syndicates market.

Australia Pacific
Headquartered in Sydney, the Australia Pacific division consists of operations in Australia, New Zealand, Papua New Guinea, and various pacific islands. QBE's joint venture in India, QBE Raheja, is also included in the Australia Pacific division for reporting purposes. The Australia Pacific portfolio provides offerings for personal, commercial, specialty and lender's mortgage (LMI) insurance lines.

Bermuda
Based in Bermuda, Equator Re is QBE’s captive reinsurer and provides reinsurance protection to the divisions in conjunction with the Group’s external reinsurance programs.

Force-placed insurance controversy
Maintaining a property insurance policy is one of the most common conditions imposed upon anyone who borrows money to purchase a house. If a borrower allows such a policy to lapse, US lenders will purchase force-placed insurance for the property owner (also called lender-placed insurance, or collateral protection insurance) The use of force-placed insurance by lenders is an ongoing practice that, in the wake of the financial crisis, has become increasingly common, being cited by many experts as the cause of foreclosures themselves. The coverage prevents gaps in insurance, which is required by the terms of most mortgages. The financial industry justifies higher premium costs of force-placed insurance policies because of the heightened insurance risk of borrowers who aren’t paying for their own insurance. Opponents of the product consistently provide statistics in opposition to these statements, citing kickback payouts and loss ratios that are much lower than the rest of the insurance industry.

Force-placed insurance policies fell under regulatory scrutiny when the New York State Department of Financial Services (DFS) launched an investigation into the lender-placed insurance industry that has so far led to settlements with QBE and Assurant Although testimony in these hearings discussed "reverse competition" and kickbacks from Assurant to its banking clients, In response to the settlement, DFS Superintendent Benjamin Lawsky stated, "Prices should not be pushing up and up, pushing borrowers over the foreclosure cliff."

In January 2013, the Consumer Financial Protection Bureau issued new mortgage servicing rules that ensures borrowers are warned in advance of force-placed insurance's cost and prevent banks from force-placing policies on many escrowed loans.  “All consumers will receive protections before a servicer may impose a charge for a force-placed insurance,” an agency spokeswoman wrote. In October 2012, QBE and California agreed to a rate reduction for lender-placed insurance, with an average savings to policyholders of $577 annually.

The Federal Housing Finance Agency, which oversees Fannie Mae, Freddie Mac, and the federal home loan banks, has looked into the relationships between force-placed insurers and their clients, determining the relationships to be fraudulent and banning any future service kickbacks. In addition, the Florida Office of Insurance Regulation is looking into the practice.

Sponsorships
QBE Insurance is also known for its sponsorship of sports teams, including naming rights sponsor of the Sydney Swans since 1985, North Harbour since 2003 and the NSW Swifts since 2008.

References

Companies listed on the Australian Securities Exchange
Financial services companies established in 1886
Financial services companies based in Sydney
Insurance companies of Australia
Australian companies established in 1886